The National Planetarium is the national planetarium of Malaysia. It is a blue-domed structure that is situated on top of a hill in the Lake Gardens at Jalan Perdana, Kuala Lumpur.

History
The National Planetarium started as the Planetarium Division in the Prime Minister's Department in 1989. The construction of the National Planetarium complex began in 1990 and was completed in 1993. A soft launch to the public began in May 1993 and it was officially opened by the Prime Minister of Malaysia, Mahathir Mohamad, on 7 February 1994. In July 1995, the Division was transferred to the Ministry of Science, Technology and the Environment, which is also the owner of this planetarium until now.

Exhibits and attractions
One of the major attractions of this planetarium includes a space theatre which screens space shows and large format film.

In the main hall are permanent exhibits related to space science. Among them is Arianne IV space engine, which is also one of the engines used to launch MEASAT 1, Malaysia's first satellite into space. A  telescope is located in the observatory.

The National Planetarium extends to a space theme park where replicas of ancient observatories are sited. It is connected by an overhead pedestrian bridge to the National Museum of Malaysia.

Operating hours
The planetarium is opened daily from 9.00 am to 4.30 pm (except on Monday, Hari Raya Puasa holiday, Hari Raya Haji holiday and public holidays as stated by the Planetarium Negara). The planetarium shows will be aired every one hour starting at 10am and the last show will be at 4pm. The entrance to the gallery is free and the shows ticket is RM 12 for adult (per person) and RM 8 for children (per person).

Transportation
The planetarium is accessible within walking distance west of Kuala Lumpur railway station.

External links

 

Planetaria in Malaysia
Museums in Kuala Lumpur
Space program of Malaysia
1994 establishments in Malaysia
Ministry of Energy, Technology, Science, Climate Change and Environment (Malaysia)